Ayşe Nazlı Çelik (born 1977) is a Turkish TV presenter. She is the daughter of Yücel and Semra Çelik, one of the managers of Doğuş Holding.

Career 
On 16 March 2016, she went to Nusaybin, Mardin, and reported on the incidents. Later in April, she went to Yüksekova, Hakkâri, and prepared an onsite field report about the events that were happening in the area. Following the release of Nazlı Çelik's reports from Yüksekova, Hakkâri, People's Democratic Party's (HDP) representative from Hakkari, Abdullah Zeydan, criticized Çelik and accused her of "acquiring rating through blood". Çelik responded to the accusations by saying, "[What is shown] is the actual place itself, not a movie set in Hollywood. Soldiers and cops are not figurants. The holes in the surrounding buildings are not drill holes. It's Yüksekova itself, where dozens of martyrs lost their lives and many terrorists were killed."

Personal life
She married Burak Öztarhan in 1999 and divorced in 2012. She then married Serdar Bilgili on 14 February 2015 in Madrid and divorced 6 months later.

Television 
TV channels
 1999–2005: NTV
 2005–: Star TV

Programs
 1999: Seçim 1999 (NTV) (with Erdoğan Aktaş)
 1999–2005: NTV Haber (NTV)
 2002: Seçim 2002 (NTV) (with Erdoğan Aktaş)
 2004: Seçim 2004 (NTV) (with Erdoğan Aktaş and Bahar Feyzan)
 2005–2006: Nazlı Öztarhan ile Gece Haberleri (Star TV)
 2006: Kırmızı Koltuk (Star TV) (with Erdoğan Aktaş)
 2006–2008: Star TV Ana Haber Bülteni (Star TV)
 2007: Türkiye'nin Seçimi 2007 (Star TV) (with Erdoğan Aktaş)
 2008–2011: Haftasonu Haberleri (Star TV)
 2011–present: Star TV Ana Haber Bülteni (Star TV)
 2014: Nazlı Çelik ile Star'da Seçim 2014 (Star TV)

Awards 
 Golden Butterfly Awards, Best TV Presenter award, 2014
 Haliç University, Best News Program of the Year, 2015
 Marmara University, Best Anchorwoman of the Year award, 2015
 Golden Butterfly Awards, Best Female News Presenter award, 2016

References 

1977 births
Living people
Turkish nationalists
Turkish television presenters